2010 JEF United Ichihara Chiba season

Competitions

Player statistics

Other pages
 J. League official site

JEF United Ichihara Chiba
JEF United Chiba seasons